Anthology 1992–1994 is a compilation album by American electro-industrial group Spahn Ranch, released on June 13, 2000, by Cleopatra Records.

Music 
The album comprises the band's first four releases: Spahn Ranch (1992), Collateral Damage (1993) and The Blackmail Starters Kit (1994) and Breath and Taxes (1994). The collection also features three songs previously unreleased in Spahn Ranch's main discography: "Machine Politics" from The Whip (1993), "Failsafe" from The Colours of Zoth Ommog (1994) and "Reinventing Gravity", which was originally credited to Coersion, from Trance in Your Mind: The Unstoppable Trance Machine (1994). The track "Tour Intro 1994" was recorded during a live performance in New York City.

Reception 

AllMusic awarded Anthology 1992–1994 four out of five stars and said "noisy, abrasive and forceful, Ranch provided some of the most memorable industrial grooves of the 1990s." Music critic Dave Thompson emphasized the importance of the collection by noting that its release was long overdue.

Track listing

Personnel 
Adapted from the album's liner notes.

Spahn Ranch
 Scott Franklin – lead vocals (2.11–2.14)
 Matt Green – sampler, keyboards, production (1.1–1.11), mixing (1.1–1.11), remixer (1.3, 2.3), guitar and bass (2.11–2.14)
 Harry Lewis – percussion (1.12, 1.13, 2.1, 2.2, 2.4, 2.6, 2.7)
 Athan Maroulis – lead vocals (1.1–1.13, 2.1–2.10), mixing (1.1–1.13), remixer (2.4)
 Rob Morton – programming, sampler, production (1.1–1.11, 2.11–2.14), loops (1.1–1.11), mixing (1.1–1.13)

Production and design
 Judson Leach – engineering, mixing (1.12, 1.13, 2.1–2.7), additional programming (1.4, 2.5), remixer (2.1–2.4)
 Eunah Lee – design
 Rod O'Brien – production, engineering and mixing (2.11–2.14)

Release history

References

External links 
 Anthology 1992–1994 at iTunes
 Anthology 1992–1994 at Discogs (list of releases)

2000 compilation albums
Spahn Ranch (band) albums
Cleopatra Records compilation albums